Javornik is a dispersed settlement near Sveti Jošt nad Kranjem in the Municipality of Kranj in the Upper Carniola region of Slovenia.

References

External links

Javornik on Geopedia

Populated places in the City Municipality of Kranj